The University of Vassouras (Portuguese: Universidade de Vassouras), also known as Severino Sombra University, is a private university in Brazil, located in the city of Vassouras, in the state of Rio de Janeiro. It was founded on January 29, 1967.

Admission
For undergraduate admission to USS two exams are used: ENEM and its own vestibular test.

References

External links
 Official website

Educational institutions established in 1967
Universities and colleges in Rio de Janeiro (state)
1967 establishments in Brazil
Private universities and colleges in Brazil